Iron(II) acetate is a coordination complex with formula Fe(O2CCH3)2. It is a white solid, although impure samples can be slightly colored.  A light green tetrahydrate is also known, which is highly soluble in water.

Preparation and structure

Iron powder reacts with acetic acid in electrolysis to give the ferrous acetate, with evolution of hydrogen gas:
Fe + 2 CH3CO2H → Fe(CH3CO2)2 + H2
It can also be made from the insoluble, olive green, Iron(II) carbonate.

It adopts a polymeric structure with octahedral Fe(II) centers interconnected by acetate ligands. It is a coordination polymer.

A hydrated form be made by the reaction of ferrous oxide or ferrous hydroxide with acetic acid.

Reaction of scrap iron with acetic acid affords a brown mixture of various iron(II) and iron(III) acetates that are used in dyeing.

Uses
Ferrous acetate is used as a mordant by the dye industry. Ebonizing wood is one such process.

References

Acetates
Iron(II) compounds